The median tongue bud (also tuberculum impar) marks the beginning of the development of the tongue. It appears as a midline swelling from the first pharyngeal arch late in the fourth week of embryogenesis. In the fifth week, a pair of lateral lingual swellings (or distal tongue buds) develop above and in line with the median tongue bud. These swellings grow downwards towards each other, quickly overgrowing the median tongue bud. The line of the fusion of the distal tongue buds is marked by the median sulcus.

References

External links
 

Embryology